Machowinko  is a village in the administrative district of Gmina Ustka, within Słupsk County, Pomeranian Voivodeship, in northern Poland.

For the history of the region, see History of Pomerania.

The village has a population of 280.

People 
 Wilhelm von Below (1783–1864), prrussian Generalleutnant
 Werner von Below (1784–1847), prussian Generalmayor

References

Machowinko